Prospero Centurione Fattinanti (Genoa, 1510 - Genoa, 1581) was the 70th Doge of the Republic of Genoa.

Biography 
Elected on October 17, 1575, he was the twenty-fifth since the biennial reform and the seventieth in republican history. The mandate of the doge Centurione Fattinanti was characterized mainly by the events that shocked Genoa and its Republic in those years, divided between the two "old" and "new" noble factions: the first ones now in the minority in the Senate and in town for the spontaneous departures from the Genoese capital, the latter called to govern together with new popular alliances. When the dogate ended on October 17, 1577, the  former doge Prospero Centurione Fattinanti was appointed perpetual procurator and was the only and last public office he held. He died in Genoa in 1581.

See also 

 Republic of Genoa
 Doge of Genoa

References 

16th-century Doges of Genoa
1510 births
1581 deaths